Love You Bangaram is a 2014 Indian Telugu-language romantic drama film directed by Goverdhan Reddy. It is produced by Maruthi Films. The film has Rahul Haridas and Shravya in the lead roles. The music director is Mahith Narayan, younger brother of noted Telugu music director, Chakri.

Cast
 Rahul Haridas as Akash
 Rajiv as Madan
 Shravya as Meenakshi
 Shatru
 RGV Shanker as Songaseenu
 Ravi Prakash as Police officer
 Trisha Dantala
 Sasi Kumar Rajendran
 Eswara Uday Sai Kiran
 Maruthi as Manager

Reception
It received negative reviews upon its release and was a disaster at the box office.

Soundtrack

The music for this film has been composed by Mahith Narayan. Audio of the film was launched in November 2013. The songs were successful before the movie release.

References

External links

2014 films
2010s Telugu-language films